Velimir Perasović (born 9 February 1965) is a Croatian professional basketball coach and former player. He is serving as the head coach for the Russian team UNICS Kazan of the VTB United League and the EuroLeague.

Early life
Perasović was born in Stobreč, at that time in the SFR Yugoslavia, to parents Gašpar and Vica Perasović. He started playing basketball at age 14.

Perasović was member of the junior men's Yugoslavia national team which won the silver medal at the 1982 FIBA Europe Under-18 Championship in Bulgaria, and the bronze medal at the 1984 FIBA Europe Under-18 Championship in Sweden.

Professional career

Perasović's club, KK Split, went on to win three EuroLeague championships, in 1989 and 1990 as "Jugoplastika", and in 1991 as "Pop 84". In 1988, 1989, 1990, and 1991, they also won the Yugoslav League championship. In 1990 and 1991, they also won the Yugoslav Cup, and in 1992, the Croatian Cup.

In 1992 Perasović moved to the Spanish club Breogán, and spent one season there, before moving to Taugrés, in 1993. He won the 1995 Spanish King's Cup, and in 1996, he won the Saporta Cup.

In 1997 he moved to the Spanish club Fuenlabrada, where he played until 2002. He then moved to the Spanish club Alicante, and retired from his basketball playing career in 2003. During his playing career in Spain, he won the Spanish ACB League Top Scorer award five times. He was also once the best scorer of the Radivoj Korać Cup, and he participated in Liga ACB All Star games.

National team career
Perasović was also a part of the senior men's national team of Yugoslavia, that won the 1990 FIBA World Championship in Argentina, and EuroBasket 1991 in Italy. He then played with the Croatia national team when they won the silver medal in the 1992 Barcelona Summer Olympics, the bronze medal at the 1994 FIBA World Championship in Canada, and the bronze medal at EuroBasket 1993 in Germany, and EuroBasket 1995 in Greece.

Coaching career
Perasović became the head coach of Split CO, before moving back to Spain, to become the head coach of Tau Cerámica. He led the team to the EuroLeague Final Four.

In the 2007–08 season, Perasović was appointed the head coach for Estudiantes, filling in for Mariano de Pablos, who had been fired due to negative results.

He then moved to Zagreb, to become the head coach for Cibona. In 2009 he led the team to the Adriatic League final, winning the award for the best coach in the Adriatic League in that season, and won the Croatian Cup and Croatian League championship, respectively. He again took Cibona to the Adriatic League and Croatian Cup finals in 2010. He also won the Croatian League championship.

In January 2012, he came back to Spain to coach Valencia. Perasović won the 2013–14 EuroCup, and left the club in January 2015. In March 2015, Perasović took over the senior Croatian men's national team. After a disappointing EuroBasket 2015 tournament, in which Croatia was defeated in the round of 16, Perasović and Croatia parted ways.

In June 2015, he came back to Spain to coach Laboral Kutxa, while in February 2016, he extended his contract with Baskonia through the 2016–17 season. After being a semifinalist of the three competitions Baskonia played (EuroLeague, Copa del Rey, and Liga ACB), Perasović left the club and went back to coach Anadolu Efes. On 16 December 2017, Anadolu Efes parted ways with him.

On 16 November 2018, he came back to Spain to the third time to coach Kirolbet Baskonia until the end of 2019–20 season to replace Pedro Martínez. On 20 December 2019, following a loss to Real Madrid, Perasović was fired from Baskonia.

On June 29, 2021, he has signed with UNICS Kazan of the VTB United League.

Coaching record

EuroLeague

|- 
| align="left" rowspan=2|Baskonia
| align="left"|2005–06
|21||15||6|||| align="center"|Won in 3rd place game
|- 
| align="left"|2006–07
|24||20||4|||| align="center"|Lost in 3rd place game
|- 
| align="left" rowspan=2|Cibona
| align="left"|2008–09
|17||8||9|||| align="center"|Eliminated in Top 16 stage
|- 
| align="left"|2009–10
|16||4||12|||| align="center"|Eliminated in Top 16 stage
|- 
| align="left"|Efes
| align="left"|2010–11
|16||7||9|||| align="center"|Eliminated in Top 16 stage
|- 
| align="left"|Valencia
| align="left"|2014–15
|10||3||7|||| align="center" |Eliminated in group stage
|- 
| align="left"|Baskonia
| align="left"|2015–16
|29||18||11|||| align="center" |Lost in 3rd place game
|- 
| align="left" rowspan=2|Anadolu Efes
| align="left"|2016–17
|35||19||16|||| align="center" |Eliminated in quarterfinals
|- 
| align="left"|2017–18
|12||3||9|||| align="center" |Fired
|- 
| align="left" rowspan=1|Baskonia
| align="left"|2018–19
|30||16||18|||| align="center" |Eliminated in quarterfinals
|-class="sortbottom"
| align="center" colspan=2|Career||214||113||101||||

Personal life
Perasović married his wife Dubravka in 1991, and the couple have two sons: Vicko and Ivan.

His younger son Ivan is also a professional basketball player currently plays with BC Labas Gas, who won the gold medal as a part of the Croatia national under-16 team at the 2018 FIBA Europe Under-16 Championship in Serbia.

References

External links

 Velimir Perasović at acb.com 
 Velimir Perasović at euroleague.net

1965 births
Living people
1990 FIBA World Championship players
Anadolu Efes S.K. coaches
Baloncesto Fuenlabrada players
Basketball players at the 1992 Summer Olympics
Basketball players at the 1996 Summer Olympics
Basketball players from Split, Croatia
Basketbol Süper Ligi head coaches
CB Breogán players
CB Estudiantes coaches
CB Lucentum Alicante players
Croatian basketball coaches
Croatian expatriate basketball people in Spain
Croatian expatriate basketball people in Turkey
Croatian men's basketball players
FIBA EuroBasket-winning players
FIBA World Championship-winning players
KK Cibona coaches
KK Split players
Liga ACB head coaches
Liga ACB players
Medalists at the 1983 Summer Universiade
Medalists at the 1992 Summer Olympics
Olympic basketball players of Croatia
Olympic medalists in basketball
Olympic silver medalists for Croatia
Saski Baskonia coaches
Saski Baskonia players
Shooting guards
Universiade medalists in basketball
Universiade silver medalists for Yugoslavia
Valencia Basket coaches
Yugoslav expatriates in Spain
Yugoslav men's basketball players